Hispan, Espan, Hispalo or Hispano, is a mythological character of Antiquity, who would derive the name Hispania, according to some ancient writers. Therefore, Hispan is the eponymous hero of Hispania. Hispan is mentioned first by the Gallo-Roman historian Gnaeus Pompeius Trogus (1st century BC) in his work Historiae Philippicae, preserved only in a later summary, probably made in the 3rd century AD by Justinus. During the Middle Ages, Hispan was also known as Espan, told of him various legends.

Yatendra & Deepmala--Background of the myth of Hispan 

Probably, the word Hispan is the latinized name of an ancient Canaanite god called B'l Spn, whose name has different meanings, as "Lord of Sapanu" or "Lord of the North". His worship was introduced into the Iberian Peninsula by the Phoenicians during the 1st millennium BC. The legends and myths of this divinity would be those set out in the medieval texts that refer to Hispano or Hispan, such as the Estoria de España of the 13th century. But scholars like Robert B. Tate defend the fictional and medieval nature of Hispan.

Origin
It is told that he was partially from Hispanic and Etruscan origin.

References 

- Isidore of Seville, Etymologiae.

- Justinus, Historiarum Philippicarum libri XLIV.

- Matesanz Gascón, Roberto, "Hispano, héroe epónimo de Hispania", Gallaecia, 21, 2002, 345-370.

- Tate, Robert B., "Mitología en la historiografía española de la Edad Media y del Renacimiento", Ensayos sobre la historiografía peninsular del siglo XV, Madrid, 1970.

Heroes in mythology and legend
Legendary Spanish people